Sands at the Sands is a 1960 live album by American singer Tommy Sands recorded at the Sands Hotel and Casino in Las Vegas.

Reception

The initial Billboard magazine review from May 30, 1960 commented that "[Sands] showcases his hits and proves that his talent will shine for a long time to come".

Track listing
  "This Could Be the Start of Something" (Steve Allen) – 3:31
  "In the Still of the Night" (Cole Porter) – 3:31
  "Night and Day" (Porter) – 0:17
  "What Is This Thing Called Love?" (Porter) – 1:23
  Medley: "I Get Along Without You Very Well"/"How Did She Look?" (Hoagy Carmichael)/(Abner Silver, Gladys Shelley) – 4:06
  "I Wanna Be Bad" (Fred Ebb, Paul Klein) – 5:20
  "I Got Plenty o' Nuttin'" (DuBose Heyward, George Gershwin, Ira Gershwin) – 2:59
  "Hello, Young Lovers" (Richard Rodgers, Oscar Hammerstein II) – 0:15
  "Everything's Coming Up Roses" (Jule Styne, Stephen Sondheim) – 1:54
  "Get Happy" (Harold Arlen, Ted Koehler) – 1:38
  "It's a Good Day" (Dave Barbour, Peggy Lee) – 0:38 
  "(I'm) All Shook Up"/"Short Shorts"/"Splish Splash"/"Hound Dog" (Bill Bellman, Hal Blaine)/(Bob Gaudio, Tom Austin, Billy Dalton, Billy Crandall)(Bobby Darin, Murray Kaufman)/(Jerry Leiber, Mike Stoller) – 4:59
  "Unchained Melody" (Alex North, Hy Zaret) – 3:38
  "Sinner Man" (Les Baxter, Will Holt) – 3:55
  "Hello, Young Lovers" – 0:15

Personnel
Tommy Sands – vocals
Ken Nelson – producer

References

External links
 

1960 live albums
Albums produced by Ken Nelson (United States record producer)
Albums recorded at the Sands Hotel
Capitol Records live albums
Tommy Sands (American singer) live albums